Raphitoma alfurica is an extinct species of sea snail, a marine gastropod mollusc in the family Raphitomidae.

Description

Distribution
Fossils of this extinct marine species were found in Pliocene strata on Timor.

References

External links
 

alfurica
Gastropods described in 1927